Mountain Brook High School (MBHS) is a three-year public high school in the city of Mountain Brook, Alabama. It is the only high school in the Mountain Brook City School System. The school's colors are green and gold and the athletic teams are known as the Spartans. The MBHS competes in AHSAA Class 6A athletics.

Recognition 
MBHS is has been featured in several rankings, including:
 MBHS was ranked 4th among the 12 Alabama schools included in the Washington Post's 2015 list of "America's Most Challenging High Schools."
 In 2014, MBHS was included among the "Top 150 high schools in the U.S." by the Daily Beast.
 In 2015, SchoolDigger ranked MBHS second among 357 high schools in the state of Alabama and first among high schools in the Birmingham-Hoover metropolitan area.
 In 2015, Niche ranked MBHS 2nd in the state of Alabama and 2nd among high schools in the Birmingham-Hoover metropolitan area.
 In 2008, The U.S. Department of Education recognized MBHS as a National Blue Ribbon School.

Athletics
 The Mountain Brook Spartans compete in Class 6A of AHSAA and hold 122 state championships.

The men's basketball team won state championships in 2013, 2014, 2017, 2018, 2019, and 2021. 

The girls' cross country team previously had a 14-year state championship winning streak.

Accomplishments
 Selected by Redbook magazine as one of 155 schools honored for "overall excellence"
 Mountain Brook has graduated three Rhodes Scholars.
 In October 2006, Mountain Brook High School's drama department, under the direction of Pat Yates, combined with Fairfield High Preparatory School to present Christopher Sergel's dramatization of Harper Lee's To Kill a Mockingbird.  The joint production received local and eventually national attention, and was featured on NBC's Today Show and NBC Nightly News.  Harper Lee herself took notice and agreed to meet with the cast.
Mountain Brook was named the top athletic program in Alabama for the 2006–2007 season by  Sports Illustrated.

Controversy 
The school attracted national attention in 2022 for a series of antisemitic incidents.  The school responded by adopting a diversity program by the Anti-Defamation League, but dropped it after complaints that the diversity program "focused too heavily on race and gender."  A Jewish student was reprimanded by the school for posting a video of a teacher making his class give a Nazi salute during a lesson on how symbols change.

Notable graduates
 Nate Bland, former MLB player (Houston Astros)
 Scott Bondy, an American folk/alternative musician. Formerly lead singer of the band Verbena. 
 Courteney Cox, actress (Friends, Scream, Cougar Town, Dirt)
 Alan Hunter, MTV Veejay
 Willson Love, former Alabama defensive linemen, Current head coach of Strength and Conditioning for Ole Miss
 Spencer Jakab, author and Wall Street Journal editor 
 David Jaffe, video game designer (God of War, Twisted Metal)
 Pat DuPré, semi-finalist at Wimbledon in 1979 and a quarter finalist in the U.S. Open. 1979–1981; he was ranked in the top 20 in the world, reaching as high as 12th.
 Graeme McFarland, football player (Indiana University)
 Emeel Salem, All-American baseball player at the University of Alabama, former minor league player in the Tampa Bay Rays organization. (6th round draft pick 2007)
 William Vlachos, center for the University of Alabama National Championship Team in 2009 and 2011.
 Tommy Dewey, actor (17 Again, The BabyMakers, The Mindy Project)
 Sarah Simmons, Top 8 finalist on season 4 of The Voice.
Tribble Reese, quarterback for Clemson, and star in the Reality Series The New Atlanta.
 Trevor Holder, pitched in College World Series for University of Georgia. Currently with Washington Nationals organization.
 Natalee Holloway (class of 2005), an 18-year-old who mysteriously disappeared while in Aruba with friends in 2005.
 Bucky McMillan, Samford basketball coach who coached at Mountain Brook from 2008 to 2020.
Trendon Watford, a LSU basketball player as of (2021)  
Patrick Claybon, Anchor for NFL Network 
Ethan Fasking, a Northeastern University roller hockey player as of 2022

References

External links
 MBHS website
 MBHS profile on SchoolDigger
 MBHS profile on Niche
Alabama High School Athletic Association Records

Public high schools in Alabama
Educational institutions established in 1966
Schools in Jefferson County, Alabama
1966 establishments in Alabama
Mountain Brook, Alabama